Live in New York City 12-31-05 is an EP by Trey Anastasio that was bundled with select CD copies of Shine at Tower Records during 2006. The disc features tracks from a live concert at Madison Square Garden in New York City on New Year's Eve 2005, where Anastasio and his band opened for The Black Crowes.

Track listing 
 Sand - 11:03
 Tuesday - 7:22
 Plasma - 5:11
 Money, Love and Change - 20:33
 Come As Melody - 6:55

2006 EPs
Trey Anastasio EPs
2006 live albums
Live EPs
Albums recorded at Madison Square Garden